Martin (died 15 July 1190) was Bishop of Meissen from 1170 to 1190.

He was supposed to have originated from the vicinity of Petersberg Abbey. Before his elevation to the episcopate he was a cathedral canon in Meissen. He was among the participants of the Third Lateran Council in 1179. Altzella Abbey was founded during his episcopate, and he made written gifts to it of lands still in dispute. Other monasteries were also founded in this period. He maintained friendly relations with Margrave Otto II, Margrave of Meissen.

Martin died while on the Third Crusade near the city of Tyre.

Bibliography 
 Eduard Machatschek: Geschichte der Bischöfe des Hochstiftes Meissen in chronologischer Reihenfolge (...),  pp. 128–135. Dresden 1884

External links 
 Marek Wejwoda: Martin in Institut für Sächsische Geschichte und Volkskunde (ed.): Sächsische Biografie 

Roman Catholic bishops of Meissen
German abbots
Year of birth unknown
1190 deaths
Christians of the Third Crusade